Luis Javier Martínez Villanueva (born Lugo, 12 July 1971) is a Spanish rugby union player. He plays as a prop.

Career
His first international cap was during a match against Germany, at Heidelberg, on 26 April 1998. He was part of the 1999 Rugby World Cup roster, where he played two matches. He was one of the Oviedo players who were in the roster, alongside Aitor Etxeberría, Sergio Souto and Carlos Souto.

References

External links
Luis Javier Martínez international statistics

1971 births
Living people
Spanish rugby union players
Rugby union props
Spain international rugby union players
Sportspeople from Lugo